Hailakandi (pron:ˈhaɪləˌkʌndi) is a town and the district headquarters of Hailakandi district in the Indian state of Assam.

Demography

According to the 2011 census, Hailakandi had a population of 33,637. Most of the people in the town follow Hinduism, with significant followers of Islam and a small Christian population.

See also
 Hailakandi Airfield
 Netaji Subhas Chandra Bose Stadium

References

External links

Map of Hailakandi

 
Cities and towns in Hailakandi district
Cities and towns in Cachar district